The 2015–16 Northern Arizona Lumberjacks men's basketball team represented Northern Arizona University during the 2015–16 NCAA Division I men's basketball season. The Lumberjacks were led by fourth year head coach Jack Murphy and played their home games at the Walkup Skydome, with one home game at the Rolle Activity Center. They were members of the Big Sky Conference. They finished the season 5–25, 3–14 in Big Sky play to finish in a tie for 11th place. They lost in the first round of the Big Sky tournament to Eastern Washington.

Previous season
They finished the season 23–15, 13–5 in Big Sky play to finish in a tie for third place. They advanced to the semifinals of the Big Sky tournament where they lost to Montana. They were invited to the CollegeInsider.com Tournament where they defeated Grand Canyon, Sacramento State, Kent State, and NJIT to advance to the CIT championship game where they lost to Evansville.

Departures

2015 incoming recruits

2016 incoming recruits

Roster

Schedule

|-
!colspan=9 style="background:#003466; color:#FFCC00;"| Exhibition

|-
!colspan=9 style="background:#003466; color:#FFCC00;"| Non-conference regular season

|-
!colspan=9 style="background:#003466; color:#FFCC00;"| Big Sky regular season

|-
!colspan=9 style="background:#003466; color:#FFCC00;"| Big Sky tournament

References

Northern Arizona Lumberjacks men's basketball seasons
Northern Arizona
Northern Arizona Lumberjacks men's basketball
Northern Arizona Lumberjacks men's basketball